This article gives an overview of liberalism in Senegal. It is limited to liberal parties with substantial support, mainly proved by having had a representation in parliament. The sign ⇒ means a reference to another party in that scheme. For inclusion in this scheme it isn't necessary so that parties labeled themselves as a liberal party.

Introduction
The Senegalese Democratic Party (Parti Démocratique Sénégalais, member LI) is a liberal party with a strong personalist character.

The timeline

Liberal leaders
Abdoulaye Wade

See also
 History of Senegal
 Politics of Senegal
 List of political parties in Senegal

References

Senegal
Politics of Senegal